Todd Martin was the defending champion, but did not participate this year.

Thomas Enqvist won the tournament, beating Magnus Gustafsson in the final, 6–3, 6–4, 6–2.

Seeds

Draw

Finals

Top half

Bottom half

External links
 Main draw

1999 Stockholm Open
1999 ATP Tour